The Reap is an arcade shooter. It was released in 1997 for the PC, developed by Housemarque and published by Take 2 Interactive Software Europe.

Gameplay 
The game has a total of 4 stages and each stage has three to four levels, altogether there are 10 levels. Players are tasked to shoot enemies in an arctic oriented scenery. Next they fly through the deep oceans, wherein between shipwrecks and fish bones are sharks, submarines, and a genetically-engineered quadrapus waiting for them. After this there comes a canyon-desert stage. At last, players fight their enemies in a skyscraper city.

The player's ship can get 5 weapon systems and all of them can be upgraded three times. The biggest weapon is a rocket blaster. Players can also find bombs or invulnerability shields.

The game was influenced by the Neo Geo game Viewpoint (video game) and shares some similarities like the isometric view.

References

1997 video games
Third-person shooters
Video games developed in Finland
Windows games
Windows-only games
Take-Two Interactive games
Housemarque games

Single-player video games
North America-exclusive video games